The 2017 Liga 3 East Kalimantan season is the second edition of Liga 3 East Kalimantan as a qualifying round for the national round of 2017 Liga 3. Persikutim East Kutai are the defending champions.

The competition scheduled starts in May 2017.

Teams
This season there are 15 club will participate the league.

References 

2017 in Indonesian football
Sport in East Kalimantan